Julie Lechanteux (born 22 December 1977) is a French politician from National Rally. She is MP for Var's 5th constituency since 2022.

Biography 
Julie Lechanteux was born on 22 December 1977 in Annecy. She is the daughter of a hairdresser and a perfumery saleswoman, she joins the FN in 2013.

She is Deputy Mayor of Fréjus under David Rachline and Departmental Councillor.

References

1977 births
Living people
21st-century French politicians
21st-century French women politicians
People from Annecy
National Rally (France) politicians
MEPs for France 2019–2024
Deputies of the 16th National Assembly of the French Fifth Republic